Heder (English: Honour) is a Swedish television series based on an idea by Sofia Helin, starring Alexandra Rapaport, Anja Lundqvist, Julia Dufvenius and Eva Röse that follows four lawyers fighting violence against women.

In June 2021, the series was renewed for a third season, which is set to premiere on Viaplay in 2022.

In December 2021, it was reported that an American remake of the series titled Honor, is in development at NBC. The project will be produced by Carol Mendelsohn Productions and Universal Television with Carol Mendelsohn and Maria Bello as executive producers.

References

External links 

Swedish television shows
2010s Swedish television series
2019 Swedish television series debuts
Swedish-language television shows